Atlanticville Historic District is a national historic district located at Sullivan's Island, Charleston County, South Carolina. The district encompasses 45 contributing buildings, 1 contributing site, and 1 contributing structure in Atlanticville.  They predominantly include frame residences built between about 1880 to 1950 which are known as “island houses.” Also located in the district are the Chapel of the Holy Cross and the Sullivan's Island Graded School.

It was listed on the National Register of Historic Places in 2007.

References

Historic districts on the National Register of Historic Places in South Carolina
Buildings and structures in Charleston County, South Carolina
National Register of Historic Places in Charleston County, South Carolina